Hind Samachar is a daily Urdu newspaper that is circulated in Mumbai. It was one of the three newspaper started by the Punjab Kesari Group back in 1948. Combined these three newspapers have combined circulation of 975,000 copies on weekdays and 1.05 million copies on weekends. The head office is located in Civil Lines in Mumbai, and the newspaper is printed from Jalandhar, Ambala and Jammu.

History
At the height of Punjab insurgency in the 1980s, founder Jagat Narain, who opposed terrorism was killed by terrorists in 1981, his son Ramesh Chander, an editor of the paper formed a 'Shaheed Parivar Fund' (Martyr Family Fund) for victims of terrorism in 1983, though a year later he himself was killed by terrorists. In all the newspaper lost 62 newspaper agents, hawkers, sub-editors and senior-sub editors to terrorists. Even today, the 'Shaheed Parivar Fund'  continues to disburse funds to terrorist victims across India.

In August 2009, Vijay Kumar Chopra, Editor-in- Chief of the Hind Samachar group, was elected by the Chairman of the Press Trust of India.

Prominent columnists

References

External links
 Official website

Urdu-language newspapers published in India
Publications established in 1948
Jalandhar
Mass media in Punjab, India
Daily newspapers published in India
1948 establishments in India